In baseball, batting average (BA) is determined by dividing a player's hits by their total at-bats. It is usually rounded to three decimal places and read without the decimal: A player with a batting average of .300 is "batting three-hundred". If necessary to break ties, batting averages could be taken beyond the .001 measurement.  In this context, .001 is considered a "point", such that a .235 batter is 5 points higher than a .230 batter.

History
Henry Chadwick, an English statistician raised on cricket, was an influential figure in the early history of baseball. In the late 19th century he adapted the concept behind the cricket batting average to devise a similar statistic for baseball. Rather than simply copy cricket's formulation of runs scored divided by outs, he realized that hits divided by at bats would provide a better measure of individual batting ability. This is because while in cricket, scoring runs is almost entirely dependent on one's batting skill, in baseball it is largely dependent on having other good hitters on one's team. Chadwick noted that hits are independent of teammates' skills, so he used this as the basis for the baseball batting average. His reason for using at bats rather than outs is less obvious, but it leads to the intuitive idea of the batting average being a percentage reflecting how often a batter gets on base, whereas hits divided by outs are not as simple to interpret in real terms.

Values

In modern times, a season batting average of .300 or higher is considered to be excellent, and an average higher than .400 a nearly unachievable goal. The last Major League Baseball (MLB) player to do so, with enough plate appearances to qualify for the batting championship, was Ted Williams of the Boston Red Sox, who hit .406 in 1941. Note that batting averages are rounded; entering the final day of the 1941 season, Williams was at 179-for-448, which is .39955 and would have been recorded as .400 via rounding. However, Williams played in both games of a doubleheader, went 6-for-8, and ended the season 185-for-456, which is .40570 and becomes .406 when rounded.

Since 1941, the highest single-season average has been .394 by Tony Gwynn of the San Diego Padres in 1994. Wade Boggs hit .401 over a 162-game span with Boston from June 9, 1985, to June 6, 1986, but never hit above .368 for an MLB season. There have been numerous attempts to explain the disappearance of the .400 hitter, with one of the more rigorous discussions of this question appearing in Stephen Jay Gould's 1996 book Full House.

Ty Cobb holds the record for highest career batting average with .366, eight points higher than Rogers Hornsby who has the second-highest career average at .358. The record for lowest career batting average for a player with more than 2,500 at-bats belongs to Bill Bergen, a catcher who played from 1901 to 1911 and recorded a .170 average in 3,028 career at-bats. Hugh Duffy, who played from 1888 to 1906, is credited with the highest single-season batting average, having hit .440 in 1894. The modern-era (post-1900) record for highest batting average for a season is held by Nap Lajoie, who hit .426 in 1901, the first year of play for the American League. The modern-era record for lowest batting average for a player that qualified for the batting title is held by Chris Davis, who hit .168 in 2018. While finishing six plate appearances short of qualifying for the batting title, Adam Dunn of the Chicago White Sox hit .159 for the 2011 season, nine points lower than the record. The highest batting average for a rookie was .408 in 1911 by Shoeless Joe Jackson.

The league batting average in MLB for the 2018 season was .248, with the highest modern-era MLB average being .296 in 1930, and the lowest being .237 in 1968. For non-pitchers, a batting average below .230 is often considered poor, and one below .200 is usually unacceptable. This latter level is sometimes referred to as "The Mendoza Line", named for Mario Mendoza — a lifetime .215 hitter but a good defensive shortstop. 

Sabermetrics, the study of baseball statistics, considers batting average a weak measure of performance because it does not correlate as well as other measures to runs scored, thereby causing it to have little predictive value. Batting average does not take into account bases on balls (walks) or power, whereas other statistics such as on-base percentage and slugging percentage have been specifically designed to measure such concepts. Adding these statistics together form a player's on-base plus slugging or "OPS". This is commonly seen as a much better, though not perfect, indicator of a player's overall batting ability as it is a measure of hitting for average, hitting for power, and drawing walks.

Anomalies
In , bases on balls were counted as hits by the major leagues in existence at the time. This inflated batting averages, with 11 players batting .400 or better, and the experiment was abandoned the following season. Historical statistics for the season were later revised, such that "Bases on balls shall always be treated as neither a time at bat nor a hit for the batter."

In rare instances, MLB players have concluded their careers with a perfect batting average of 1.000. John Paciorek had three hits in all three of his turns at bat. Esteban Yan went two-for-two, including a home run. Hal Deviney's two hits in his only plate appearances included a triple, while Steve Biras, Mike Hopkins, Chet Kehn, Jason Roach and Fred Schemanske also went two-for-two. A few dozen others have hit safely in their only career at-bat.

Qualifications for the batting title
The MLB batting averages championships (often referred to as "the batting title") are awarded annually to the player in each league who has the highest batting average. Ty Cobb holds the MLB and American League (AL) record for most batting titles, officially winning 11 in his career. The National League (NL) record of eight batting titles is shared by Honus Wagner and Tony Gwynn. Most of Cobb's career and all of Wagner's career took place in what is known as the Dead-Ball Era, which was characterized by higher batting averages by star players (although the overall league batting average was historically at its lowest during that era) and much less power, whereas Gwynn's career took place in the Live-Ball Era.

To determine which players are eligible to win the batting title, the following conditions have been used over the sport's history:

 Pre-1920 – A player generally is required to appear in at least 100 or more games when the schedule was 154 games, and 90 games when the schedule was 140 games. An exception to the rule was made for Ty Cobb in 1914, who appeared in 98 games but had a big lead and was also a favorite of American League President Ban Johnson.
 1920–1949 – A player had to appear in 100 games to qualify in the NL; the AL used 100 games from 1920 to 1935, and 400 at-bats from 1936 to 1949. The NL was advised to adopt 400 at-bats for the 1945 season, but National League President Ford Frick refused, feeling that 100 games should stand for the benefit of catchers and injured players. (Taffy Wright is often erroneously said to have been cheated out of the 1938 batting title; he batted .350 in exactly 100 games, with 263 ABs. Jimmie Foxx hit .349, in 149 games and 565 AB. But since the AL requirement that year was 400 at-bats, Foxx's batting title is undisputed.)
 1950–1956 – A player needed 2.6 at-bats per team game originally scheduled. (With the 154-game schedule of the time, that meant a rounded-off 400 at-bats.) From 1951 to 1954, if the player with the highest average in a league failed to meet the minimum at-bat requirement, the remaining at-bats until qualification (e.g., five at-bats, if the player finished the season with 395 at-bats) were hypothetically considered hitless at-bats; if his recalculated batting average still topped the league, he was awarded the title. This standard was applied in the AL from 1936 to 1956.
 1957 to the present – A player has needed 3.1 plate appearances per team game originally scheduled; thus, players were no longer penalized for walking so frequently, nor did they benefit from walking so rarely. (In 1954, for example, Ted Williams batted .345 but had only 386 ABs, while topping the AL with 136 walks. Williams thus lost the batting title to Cleveland's Bobby Ávila, who hit .341 in 555 ABs.) In the 154-game schedule, the required number of plate appearances was 477, and since the era of the 162-game schedule, the requisite number of plate appearances has been 502. Adjustments to this figure have been made during strike-shortened seasons, such as 1972, 1981, 1994, and 1995.

From 1967 to the present, if the player with the highest average in a league fails to meet the minimum plate-appearance requirement, the remaining at-bats until qualification (e.g., five at-bats, if the player finished the season with 497 plate appearances) are hypothetically considered hitless at-bats; if his recalculated batting average still tops the league, he is awarded the title. This is officially Rule 10.22(a), but it is also known as the Tony Gwynn rule because the Padres' player won the batting crown in 1996 with a .353 average on just 498 plate appearances (i.e., he was four short). Gwynn was awarded the title since he would have led the league even if he'd gone 0-for-4 in those missing plate appearances. His average would have dropped to .349, five points better than second-place Ellis Burks' .344. In 2012, a one-time amendment to the rule was made to disqualify Melky Cabrera from the title. Cabrera requested that he be disqualified after serving a suspension that season for a positive testosterone test. He had batted .346 with 501 plate appearances, and the original rule would have awarded him the title over San Francisco Giants teammate Buster Posey, who won batting .336.

All-time leaders

Major League Baseball

Different sources of baseball records present somewhat differing lists of career batting average leaders. There is consensus that Ty Cobb leads this category. Further rankings vary by source, primarily due to differences in minimums needed to qualify (number of games played or plate appearances), or differences in early baseball records. Baseball-Reference.com includes the Negro League teams considered major leagues by Major League Baseball. The below table presents the top ten lists as they appear in four well-known sources, with the rankings and degree of precision (decimal places) as provided in the source. The main article linked above is sourced from Baseball-Reference.com, which is also presented here. None of the players listed below are still living; each is an inductee of the Baseball Hall of Fame, except for Lefty O'Doul, Pete Browning, and Shoeless Joe Jackson (who is ineligible due to his alleged role in the Black Sox Scandal of 1919).

Minor League Baseball
The highest recorded single-season batting average in Minor League Baseball is .462, accomplished by Gary Redus in 1978, when he played for the Billings Mustangs, an affiliate of the Cincinnati Reds in the Rookie Advanced-level Pioneer League. Redus was 117-for-253 in 68 games, as the Pioneer League only plays from June to early September. Redus went on to play in MLB from 1982 through 1994, batting .252 during his MLB career.

Nippon Professional Baseball
In Nippon Professional Baseball (NPB), the leader in career batting average is Isao Harimoto, a member of the Japanese Baseball Hall of Fame, who hit .319 in his NPB career. Nori Aoki is an active NPB player has the opportunity to pass Harimoto as his batting average currently sits at .317.  Ichiro Suzuki batted .353 in NPB, but does not have enough NPB career at-bats to qualify for the league's title.

See also
List of Major League Baseball batting champions
Baseball statistics
Batting average

References

Further reading

External links
Career Leaders & Records for Batting Average at Baseball-Reference.com

Batting statistics